Harold Earl Roche (September 8, 1893 – August 22, 1961) was a Canadian politician. He served in the Legislative Assembly of British Columbia from 1956 to 1960, as a Social Credit member for the constituency of North Peace River.

References

British Columbia Social Credit Party MLAs
1893 births
1961 deaths